Eresinopsides bichroma is a butterfly in the family Lycaenidae. It is found in Kenya and Tanzania. The habitat consists of dense coastal and lowland forests.

Subspecies
Eresinopsides bichroma bichroma (north-eastern Tanzania)
Eresinopsides bichroma jefferyi Stempffer, 1950 (coast of Kenya)

References

Butterflies described in 1911
Poritiinae